John "Beau" Billingslea (born 1944) is an American actor, known as the voice of Jet Black in the critically acclaimed anime Cowboy Bebop, Ogremon in Digimon and Homura and Ay, the Fourth Raikage in Naruto Shippuden. In addition to voice acting, he appeared in many television shows and some films including North and South Book II: Love and War, Just Jordan, The Hannah Montana Movie and Star Trek Into Darkness.

Biography

Early life and career
Billingslea was born in Charleston, South Carolina. His mother was from Malensis, South Carolina, near Charleston, and his father was from Macon, Georgia. His family moved to Meriden, Connecticut, where he grew up. At Maloney High School, he lettered in football, basketball and baseball and was offered a contract with the Kansas City Athletics, but at the advice of his father, went to University of Connecticut, where he played football and co-captained in his senior year. He graduated with a Bachelor's in Political Science in 1966. He was involved in ROTC and had to turn down entering the NFL in order to fulfill his military service, however, his commitment was deferred so that he could attend UConn Law School, where he graduated and passed the Connecticut bar in 1969. He became an officer in the Army's Judge Advocate General's Corps and had tours in Germany and Europe, working on a number of cases. In Germany, he also taught criminal law for the University of Maryland's extension program.

Acting career
While in college, Billingslea was encouraged by his fraternity brother to perform the lead role in a production of The Emperor Jones. This inspired him to go into acting, and he started getting involved professionally while he was in law school. After moving to Los Angeles, he was involved in a number of action shows, including TJ Hooker, Hunter, The Fall Guy and The A-Team. Billingslea mentioned in an interview that it was probably because of his military background that he was often cast as an officer. He portrayed Ezra in the TV miniseries North and South and was involved in a number of shows including Who's the Boss?, Murphy Brown and Married... with Children. On the Nick series Just Jordan he played Jordan's maternal grandfather Grant. In the TV sitcom Franklin & Bash he portrayed Judge Douglas. He also acted in films such as Night Shift, The American President, Hannah Montana: The Movie, Halloween H20: 20 Years Later and a remake of The Blob. In 2013, he portrayed Captain Abbot of the Starship Bradbury in the feature film Star Trek Into Darkness. He continues to act in stage plays such as Driving Miss Daisy where he was nominated for a Los Angeles Ovation Award in 2005.

Voice-over career
Billingslea's voice-over work started with radio spots for various businesses and organizations, including Honda, Hood and California Highway Patrol. He worked on several cartoons and anime, his most notable being Jet Black in Cowboy Bebop, which was broadcast on Cartoon Network's Adult Swim programming block. He also voiced starring characters Captain Michael Heartland in Argento Soma; Oji Tanaka in The Legend of Black Heaven, which was broadcast on International Channel and was the voice of Ogremon and various "mons" in Digimon. In Naruto, he voices Homura and Ay, the Fourth Raikage. He attended several anime conventions, including the 2016 Anime Expo, which united the Cowboy Bebop English voice cast. He has also been involved in narrating shows on The History Channel including Hero Ships, Modern Marvels, and Suicide Missions.

Personal life
Billingslea lives in the Los Angeles area. He is married to Cecelia Billingslea; they have a son and a daughter together. In 1987, Billingslea was inducted into the Meriden Hall of Fame. In 2014, he gave the keynote address at a UConn Law School reunion.

Filmography

Live-action filmography

Television

Feature films

Voice-over filmography

Anime

Animation

Direct-to-video and television films

Feature films

Video games

References

Book sources

External links 
 
 
  Beau Billingslea at Crystal Acids Voice Actor Database
 

1944 births
Living people
African-American male actors
American male film actors
American male television actors
American male video game actors
American male voice actors
Male actors from Charleston, South Carolina
Male actors from Los Angeles
People from Meriden, Connecticut
UConn Huskies football players
University of Connecticut alumni
University of Connecticut School of Law alumni
20th-century African-American people
21st-century African-American people
20th-century American male actors
21st-century American male actors